Tom Haynes (born 9 September 1997) is an English cricketer. He made his first-class debut on 26 March 2019, for Loughborough MCCU against Leicestershire, as part of the Marylebone Cricket Club University fixtures.

References

External links
 

1997 births
Living people
English cricketers
Loughborough MCCU cricketers
Place of birth missing (living people)